A superficial acral fibromyxoma is a type of myxoma and is a rare cutaneous condition characterized by a mesenchymal neoplasm that typically occurs on the digits of middle-aged adults.

See also 
 Skin lesion

References 

Dermal and subcutaneous growths